Don Joyce (October 8, 1929 – February 26, 2012) was an American football defensive end and professional wrestler.

Early life 
Joyce was born in Steubenville, Ohio, to James and Frances Joyce. He attended Steubenville High School and Tulane University. At Tulane, he lettered in both 1949 and 1950 and was inducted into the Hall of Fame. He was a member of the Green Wave's last Southeastern Conference championship team in 1949 (Tulane withdrew from the SEC following the 1965 football season).

American football career 
In the 1951 National Football League Draft, Joyce was picked 18th overall by the Chicago Cardinals. He played with the Cardinals until being transferred to the Baltimore Colts three years later in 1954. During his career with the Colts, the team won the NFL championship in 1958 and 1959. Joyce was named to the Pro Bowl following the 1958 season. For the 1961 season, Joyce transferred to the Minnesota Vikings. The following year, Joyce played for the American Football League's Denver Broncos. He played only six games for the Broncos, and retired after the 1962 season.

Professional wrestling career 
Joyce was a professional wrestler during the football off-season. Debuting in 1956, he worked mainly in and around the Baltimore, Maryland area for Vince McMahon, Sr. He wrestled exclusively as a face ("good guy") character, owing to his NFL contract which stated he could not work as a heel ("bad guy"). He sometime teamed with Gene Lipscomb. During his professional wrestling career, Joyce became a one-time NWA United States Television Champion.

Personal life 
Joyce was married and had three children. After retiring from football and professional wrestling, Joyce worked as a football coach at DeLaSalle High School in Minneapolis for five years. He was also a football scout for thirty years, including seven years as the head scout for the Colts until 1995. In 1983, Joyce was shot twice following a robbery in a hotel room in Sikeston, Missouri, and required surgery to remove a bullet from his shoulder. His wife suffered a head injury after being pistol-whipped, but both made a full recovery.

Joyce died on February 26, 2012, in Mahtomedi, Minnesota, and was buried on March 2.

See also 
Other American Football League players

Footnotes 

1929 births
2012 deaths
American football defensive linemen
American male professional wrestlers
Baltimore Colts players
Denver Broncos (AFL) players
Chicago Cardinals players
Minnesota Vikings players
Sportspeople from Steubenville, Ohio
Tulane Green Wave football players
Western Conference Pro Bowl players